Human Desire is a 1954 American film noir drama starring Glenn Ford, Gloria Grahame and Broderick Crawford directed by Fritz Lang. It is loosely based on Émile Zola's 1890 novel La Bête humaine. The story had been filmed twice before: La Bête humaine (1938), directed by Jean Renoir, and Die Bestie im Menschen, starring Ilka Grüning (1920).

The Academy Film Archive preserved Human Desire in 1997.

Plot
Korean War veteran Jeff Warren returns to his town and duties as a train engineer, driving streamliners hauling passenger trains for the fictional Central National railroad. Warren worked alongside Alec Simmons and was a boarder in his home before going off to war. Alec's daughter Ellen is smitten with Jeff.

Carl Buckley is a gruff, hard-drinking assistant yard supervisor married to the younger Vicki. After Carl is fired for talking back to his boss, Carl begs Vicki to visit John Owens, a man from her past and an important customer of the railroad. Carl hopes Owens' influence could help him reclaim his job, but when Vicki is gone for hours, Carl surmises that she has been unfaithful. After a violent argument during which he elicits the truth from her, Carl forces Vicki to write a short letter to Owens, setting up a meeting with him later that night in his sleeping car drawing room. Owens is taking the train to Chicago and Carl and Vicki are returning home. Carl and Vicki barge into Owens' room and Carl kills Owen with a knife that he had used for whittling. Carl takes Owens' wallet and pocket watch to make the murder appear to be the result of a robbery, also taking the letter that Vicki had written. Carl tells Vicki that he is keeping the letter to prevent her from going to the police. After the murder, Carl sees Jeff on the train and persuades Vicki to distract him seductively so that Carl can pass unnoticed.

At the murder inquest, Jeff and other train passengers are called as witnesses. Jeff denies having seen anyone suspicious. Vicki and Jeff soon resume their relationship. She lies about the night of the murder, saying that she had visited Owens' compartment for a liaison but found him dead. Jeff questions why she did not seem distressed when they met on the train. Vicki explains that she is frightened of Carl's temper and shows Jeff marks on her body where Carl had hit her.

Ellen sells Jeff a ticket to an upcoming dance, and hopes that he will invite her, but she knows that he is involved with Vicki. Jeff tells Vicki that he wants to marry her and that she should leave Carl. She tells Jeff the truth about Owens' murder and the letter, but Jeff remains determined to keep Vicki.

Carl has become a drunk and has again lost his job. Vicki tells Jeff that Carl is selling the house and forcing her to leave town with him. She cannot find the letter and suspects that Carl must keep it with him. She suggests that she and Jeff will have to part forever but hints that things would be easier with Carl out of the way.

Jeff, clutching a large monkey wrench, follows a drunk Carl in a railyard before a passing train blocks the view of the characters. Later, Jeff tells Vicki that he could not murder Carl and accuses her of setting him up so that he would kill Carl. She tells Jeff that she loves him and that if he loved her he would have killed for her. Jeff hands her the letter, which he has taken from Carl's pocket and leaves.

When Vicki gets on the next train, Carl confronts her, imploring her not to leave him. He offers her the letter but she tells him that he does not have it. Carl accuses her of running away with Jeff, which she denies. She admits that she is in love with Jeff, and had asked him to kill Carl, but reveals that Jeff rejected her. Carl strangles Vicki to death.

Meanwhile, Jeff operates the train alongside Alec.  He reflects on the dance ticket that he bought from Ellen, once again enjoying a warm relationship with her father.

Cast
 Glenn Ford as Jeff Warren
 Gloria Grahame as Vicki Buckley
 Broderick Crawford as Carl Buckley
 Edgar Buchanan as Alec Simmons
 Kathleen Case as Ellen Simmons
 Peggy Maley as Jean
 Diane DeLaire as Vera Simmons
 Grandon Rhodes as John Owens

Production
This film was largely shot in the vicinity of El Reno, Oklahoma. It used the facilities of what was at the time the Rock Island Railroad (now Union Pacific), though some of the moving background shots show East Coast scenes such as the Pulaski Skyway and the famous Lower Trenton Bridge ("Trenton Makes — The World Takes") over the Delaware River.

The production utilizes other stock railroad footage. A major number of scenes take place around CRI&P Alco FA unit No. 153 painted as the fictitious Central National, however the interiors were filmed using a Hollywood mock-up of an EMD F-unit .

Human Desire was released in 2019 on dual-format Blu-ray Region B by Eureka!, U.K. and on world-wide Region A/B/C compatible Blu-ray in 2020 from Blackfire Productions, Spain.

Reception
A contemporary review in Variety wrote that Lang "... goes overboard in his effort to create mood." Bosley Crowther of The New York Times wrote at the time of the film's release, "[T]here isn't a single character in it for whom it builds up the slightest sympathy—and there isn't a great deal else in it for which you're likely to have the least regard."

In 2008 critic Dave Kehr wrote of the film, "Gloria Grahame, at her brassiest, pleads with Glenn Ford to do away with her slob of a husband, Broderick Crawford. ... A gripping melodrama, marred only by Ford's inability to register an appropriate sense of doom." 

As of 2022 Rotten Tomatoes rated the film at 59% positive based on 17 reviews.

References

External links
 
 
 
 
 

1954 films
1954 crime drama films
American crime drama films
American black-and-white films
Adultery in films
Film noir
Rail transport films
Columbia Pictures films
Films based on French novels
Films based on works by Émile Zola
Films directed by Fritz Lang
Films shot in Oklahoma
Films scored by Daniele Amfitheatrof
1950s English-language films
1950s American films